Dobrovščak is a small settlement in the Slovene Hills north of the town of Ormož in northeastern Slovenia. The area belongs to the traditional region of Styria and is now included in the Drava Statistical Region.

References

External links
Dobrovščak on Geopedia

Populated places in the Municipality of Ormož